Natica rouxi is a species of predatory sea snail, a marine gastropod mollusk in the family Naticidae, the moon snails.

Description

Distribution
This marine species occurs off Gabon.

References

 Nicklès M. 1952. Mollusques testacés marins du littoral de l'A.E.F. Journal de Conchyliologie, 92: 143-154.

External links

Naticidae
Gastropods described in 1952